The Strange Allies: Poland and the United States, 1941-1945 is a 1978 book by Richard C. Lukas. It deals with the relationship between the United States and the Polish government-in-exile during World War II and highlighted the impact of American Polonia in United States-Polish relations.

Lukas continued this topic with Bitter Legacy: Polish-American Relations in the Wake of World War II (1982), described by one reviewer as a "sequel" to The Strange Allies. Bitter Legacy deals with postwar Polish history and Polish-American relations, as well as the aid that was extended to Poland after World War II.

References

1978 books
History books about Poland
History books about the United States
Poland–United States relations
Books by  Richard C. Lukas
History books about World War II